

131001–131100 

|-bgcolor=#f2f2f2
| colspan=4 align=center | 
|}

131101–131200 

|-id=181
| 131181 Žebrák ||  || Žebrák is a historic town in Central Bohemia, Czech Republic, known for its medieval castles of Žebrák and Točník, a meteorite fall in 1824, and its creative astronomical observatory active in the field of public education. || 
|-id=186
| 131186 Pauluckas || 2001 DS || Paul Luckas (born 1962), Australian amateur astronomer, discoverer of minor planets and supernovae || 
|}

131201–131300 

|-id=245
| 131245 Bakich ||  || Michael E. Bakich (born 1953), American historian of astronomy, author, and senior editor of Astronomy || 
|}

131301–131400 

|-bgcolor=#f2f2f2
| colspan=4 align=center | 
|}

131401–131500 

|-bgcolor=#f2f2f2
| colspan=4 align=center | 
|}

131501–131600 

|-bgcolor=#f2f2f2
| colspan=4 align=center | 
|}

131601–131700 

|-bgcolor=#f2f2f2
| colspan=4 align=center | 
|}

131701–131800 

|-id=762
| 131762 Csonka ||  || János Csonka (1852–1939), Hungarian engineer, inventor of the first Hungarian gas engine and co-inventor of the carburetor with Donát Bánki (this minor planet was discovered on the 150th anniversary of his birth) || 
|-id=763
| 131763 Donátbánki ||  || Donát Bánki (1859–1922), Hungarian mechanical engineer, co-inventor, with János Csonka, of the carburetor in 1893 || 
|}

131801–131900 

|-bgcolor=#f2f2f2
| colspan=4 align=center | 
|}

131901–132000 

|-bgcolor=#f2f2f2
| colspan=4 align=center | 
|}

References 

131001-132000